Cepari is a commune in Argeș County, Muntenia, Romania. It is composed of eight villages: Cărpeniș, Ceparii Pământeni (the commune centre), Ceparii Ungureni, Morăști, Șendrulești, Urluiești, Valea Măgurei and Zamfirești.

References

Communes in Argeș County
Localities in Muntenia